Ezequiel Gastón Mastrolía (born 25 March 1991) is an Argentine professional footballer who plays as a goalkeeper for Estudiantes.

Career
Mastrolía began his career with San Lorenzo. He made his debut for the club in a Copa Argentina victory over Villa Dálmine in November 2011. Mastrolía remained with San Lorenzo for three further years but never appeared in the league; though was an unused substitute twenty-seven times. July 2014 saw Mastrolía join Comunicaciones of Primera B Metropolitana, whom he would make ten appearances for during the 2014 season. On 1 January 2015, Mastrolía completed a move to fellow third tier outfit Platense. His first appearance arrived on 17 February against Almirante Brown, the first of twenty-seven in his opening campaign.

In July 2017, Mastrolía joined Argentine Primera División side Talleres but was soon loaned out to Mitre in Primera B Nacional. He featured on fifteen occasions during 2017–18 as Mitre finished thirteenth. Mastrolía was released at the end of 2019 by Talleres, with the goalkeeper subsequently joining Estudiantes in July 2020.

Career statistics
.

References

External links

1991 births
Living people
Footballers from Buenos Aires
Argentine footballers
Association football goalkeepers
Argentine Primera División players
Primera B Metropolitana players
Primera Nacional players
San Lorenzo de Almagro footballers
Club Comunicaciones footballers
Club Atlético Platense footballers
Talleres de Córdoba footballers
Club Atlético Mitre footballers
Estudiantes de Buenos Aires footballers